The Gaon Album Chart is a record chart that ranks the best-selling albums and EPs in South Korea. It is part of the Gaon Music Chart which launched in February 2010. The data for the chart is compiled by the Ministry of Culture, Sports and Tourism and the Korean Music Content Industry Association based on weekly and monthly physical albums and digital sales by six major distributors: LOEN Entertainment, S.M. Entertainment, Sony Music Korea, Warner Music Korea, Universal Music and Mnet Media.

Overall, EXO's XOXO Repackage (korean ver) album was Gaon Album Chart best selling album of 2013, selling 335,823 copies. EXO also sold South Korea best-selling album of 2013 with all standard XOXO (korean ver) and reissue XOXO (chinese ver), XOXO Repackage (korean ver) and XOXO Repackage (chinese ver) albums selling a total of 1,006,473 units overall. The group won Album of The Year at 2013 Mnet Asian Music Awards, Album of The Year (3rd Quarter) & (4th Quarter)  at 3rd Gaon Chart Music Awards, Disk Daesang and Disk Bonsang at 28th Golden Disc Awards.

Weekly charts

Monthly charts

Notes

References

External links 
 Gaon Charts - Official Website 

2013
Korea, South albums
2013 in South Korean music

de:Liste der Nummer-eins-Hits in Südkorea (2013)